'What Happens After Nora Leaves Home?' (Simplified Chinese: "娜拉走后怎样？"; Traditional Chinese: "娜拉走後怎樣？"; Pinyin: "Nà Lā Zǒu Hòu Zěn Yàng?") is a speech given by Chinese writer Lu Xun at Beijing Women's Normal College in 1923. In his speech, Lu Xun evaluated the ending of A Doll's House by Norwegian playwright Henrik Ibsen, where the heroine Nora leaves home to search for her selfhood. Concerned with the blind following of Nora's rebel, Lu Xun spoke to address its potential danger.

Lu Xun takes a pessimistic view on Nora's departure, stating that her follow-up options are either prostitution or a humiliating return because of her economic incapability. As his critique of Nora furthers, Lu Xun expands to discuss the general political and economic oppression facing Chinese society. He believes economic independence is the foundation of a liberated mind, and could only be achieved through radical social revolution, which will free China from all forms of enslavement. Nevertheless, he is ambiguous as to when and how the revolution will take place.

Lu Xun's emphasis on economic independence and its connection with political liberation shows his insightful observation on contemporary Chinese society. However, as later academics point out, his argument is still flawed as it overlooks the story's other characters, overemphasizes material needs over internal change and marginalizes women's issues for nationalistic purposes. Lu Xun's 1925 short story, 'Regret for the Past('伤逝', 'Shangshi')', is considered as the literary spiritual successor of his take on Nora.

Synopsis

Henrik Ibsen's A Doll's House (1879) 
Henrik Ibsen's 1879 play A Doll's House follows the individual awakening of Nora Helmer, wife to a bank employee named Torvald Helmer. When a faux scandal breaks out that threatens the livelihood of the Helmers, Torvald accuses Nora of ruining his life, contrary to his earlier promise to take on everything himself as the man of the family. After learning the scandal would be resolved secretly, Torvald is overjoyed and forgives Nora. However, Nora, who has seen Torvald's true selfish character, decides to leave. She tells Torvald that like her father, he had never known her—even she doesn't know who she really is herself. She states that she felt like a 'puppet' under Torvald's control and she needs some time to live alone to understand herself. The play ends as Nora leaves Torvald, with the door slamming on her exit from the house. The play is considered one of the best works depicting female predicament of the Western bourgeois class. Scholar Joan Templeton praised the ending, noting it 'constitutes nineteenth-century feminism's universally agreed-upon base for women's emancipation".

What Happens After Nora Leaves Home?(1923) 
In the speech, Lu Xun reexamines Nora's prospect and addresses the importance of economic freedom. At first, Lu Xun gives a summary of A Doll's House and describes it as 'social drama' that depicts the ugliness of social reality. Next, Lu Xun calls to rethink the ending of A Doll's House: 'What happens after Nora walks out?'. He suggests two possible outcomes: 'Logically, however, Nora really has only two options: to fall into degradation(prostitution) or to return home'. In his reasoning, Nora is compared to a 'caged bird' who no longer knows how to fly or what danger lies outside. Similar to someone who wakes up from a dream and realizes 'there is no way out', Lu Xun believes Nora will inevitably fall into tragic outlooks.

After envisioning the destined failure of Nora's future, Lu Xun continues to evaluate the psychological effectiveness of living in ignorance. At first, he affirms that it is reassuring to live in ignorance and sometimes it is essential to do so, noting that 'People who dream are fortunate. If there isn't a way out, it is important not to wake them'. To Lu Xun, to make people aware of a desperate reality only means more suffering for themselves, as there is nothing for them to do other than 'to witness their own rotting corpses'. However, he also admits that a dreamer awakened can no longer return to his dream calmly. As Nora becomes aware of her husband's manipulation, her awakening is inevitable and so is her departure.

Lu Xun then proposes that in order for Nora to avoid her destined failure, she will have to need money. He argues that a liberated mind can go nowhere without the support of material possessions. In doing so, he shifts from predicting Nora's future to emphasizing the importance of economic freedom. He writes:'So for Nora, money (or to put it more elegantly, economic means) is crucial. It is true that freedom cannot be bought, but it can be sold. Human beings have one major defect: they are apt to get hungry.'To compensate for this defect, as Lu Xun continues, individual economic freedom must be achieved. However, he believes the pursuit for economic rights will be met with more hindrance than the advocation of political rights, as material needs are more basic for human survival than the distribution of power. In his ideal vision, economic equality should be achieved in peace within the family, as parents equally distribute family property to their offsprings to live as they will. Nevertheless, he admits this is 'rather a distant dream', and the only way for its realization would be for everyone to keep track of their past mistakes so they don't repeat them in the future.

Next, Lu Xun expands his emphasis on economic freedom from individual to society. He asks if individual economic freedom is the solution to the broader systematic hierarchy of subjugation between class and gender. He argues that economic freedom is only an 'intermediate goal' leading to a more overall solution. Therefore, Lu Xun contends that the only way to obtain political and economic freedom is revolution--'to fight for them' with extreme audacity and tenacity.

However, Lu Xun notes in dismal that 'it's too difficult to change China'. He launches attacks on the passive inaction of the Chinese masses, criticizing that they have been nothing more than 'spectators at a play'. In consideration of this, Lu Xun urges his listeners to fight carefully and enduringly, rather than resorting to the brief sacrifice which will soon be forgotten. Nevertheless, he still bears expectations for China's future. With a mixed undertone, Lu Xun predicts a revolution will come eventually, but how and when he cannot tell.

Background

Historical Background 
Four years before Lu Xun gave his speech on Ibsen's A Doll's House, one of the most significant social movements in China, the May Fourth Movement, took place in Beijing. On 4 May 1919, students gathered to protest against the signing of Versailles Peace Treaty and imperial Japan's 'Twenty-one Demands', which quickly culminated into the rise of public awareness of China's national identity. The May Fourth Movement represents 'the beginning of China's modern revolutionary era, and a new stage after the Republican Revolution of 1911'. Culturally, the May Fourth Movement advocates for gexing jiefang (个性解放), or in English, 'the emancipation of individuality'. It urges for reexamination of traditional Chinese values in favour of individuality. For this reason, Chinese intellectuals looked to the West for new models of ideas.

Reception of Ibsen: 'The Nora Compulsion' 
Among these ideological inspirations are the works of Norwegian playwright Henrik Ibsen. As early as 1907, Lu Xun has noticed Ibsen's appeals and wrote essays to praise his play, An Enemy of the People(1882). But it was not until ten years later that Ibsen's works found broader appeal among the Chinese readers. In 1918, the influential New Youth magazine dedicated an entire special issue to introduce Ibsen and his works. Comprising Ibsen's biography, reflexive essays and translation of his works (including A Doll's House, An Enemy of the People and Little Eyolf), the issue served as a systematic guide for Ibsen's works and was enthusiastically received by Chinese readers. His plays, performed in Beijing and Shanghai, won critical and mass acclaims alike. The character of Nora, especially, sparked discussions on marital freedom as many considered her as the symbol of individuality, and a refusal to the repressive Confucian traditions. Inspired by her spirit, many young Chinese rebelled against their family and left home for the sake of individual liberation, a phenomenon coined by some as the 'Nora Compulsion' (or 'Ibsen-fever'/'Chinese Nora-ism').

Debate on Ibsen's Nora

Hu Shi's Nora 
Accompanying the New Youth special issue was an essay written by editor Hu Shi, leading intellectual of the May Fourth Movement. The essay was entitled 'Ibsenism' ('易卜生主义', Yipushengzhuyi), where he analyzed the motifs of Ibsen's works. In Hu Shi's opinion, Ibsen's works are 'realistic', as they eloquently expose the dark side of social reality. Hu Shi incorporates Ibsen's revolutionary ideals into his critique against traditional Confucian values, denouncing 'immoral' feudal practices which hinder the liberation of individuality. Inspired by A Doll's House, Hu wrote a play named The Greatest Event in Life (1919), deemed by some as the Chinese iteration of 'the Nora-problem', with the same emphasis on individual autonomy over familial oppression. However, Hu's vision was slowly overshadowed by Lu Xun, whose interpretation of Nora would spark a series of debates on individualism, the ideology most valued by Hu and the May Fourth Movement.

Lu Xun's Nora 
Presented as a speech at a women's vocational school, Lu Xun warns against the danger of 'the Nora Compulsion'. As Lu Xun affirms the revolutionary ideal embodied by Hu Shi's Nora, he appeals his listeners to rethink its feasibility. Like Hu Shi, Lu Xun recognizes Ibsen's plays as 'social drama', pinpointing that while Ibsen depicts social injustices, he is not obliged to provide ready-made solutions. He argues that despite the feminist implication of Ibsen's works, he never wrote specifically to address the problem of women's liberation. Therefore, men and women alike should be alert of Nora's false promise.

What makes Lu Xun's Nora distinct is his emphasis on economic freedom and radical revolution. Departing form a 'socialist' perspective, Lu Xun's critique consists of three arguments: first, economic independence is most crucial to individual liberation; second, economic independence could only be achieved through radical revolution; and third, individual liberation could not be achieved unless the collective society is priorly liberated. Different from Hu Shi and Ibsen, Lu Xun highlights external factor (money) over internal awakening, expanding his argument from individual emancipation to general political liberation. As he vaguely suggests revolution as the solution, the implication is that only a comprehensive social change will liberate its individual member, not the other way around. Lu Xun's inclination for external change over internal liberation is also shown in his 1934 essay, 'On Women's Liberation(有关妇女解放,'Youguan funv jiefang')', in which he wrote, 'when society is liberated, we ourselves will be liberated too'.

Lu Xun also criticizes the destructive power of the blind crowd, noting its favour 'to spectate' instead of 'to act'. While he believes the society will help Nora, its sympathy will expire in no time as Nora's 'novelty' wears out. In Lu Xun's opinion, Nora's departure is a show of fascination in the patriarchal eyes of the Chinese society, an actual spectacle the 'thrill-seeking masses' will eventually grow weary of. Lu Xun's critique of Nora and her spectating value shows his ambivalence of female representation in contemporary Chinese society. Lu Xun's take on Nora, as Eileen Cheng argues, is 'tempered by a deeper reflection on the implications of promoting such public visibility for women in light of Chinese social realities and the continued currency of traditional gender norms'.

Limitation of Lu Xun's interpretation 
However, some have pointed out the limitations of Lu Xun's critique. Several scholars argue that Nora is capable to survive without her husband's support. As Zheng Hansheng points out, Nora already exhibits traits of decisiveness as she refuses to succumb to the threat of her debtor. Before she leaves the house, her independent character has already formed during the events of the play. Moreover, some note that a role model already exists in the play: Nora's old friend Mrs. Linde, whose self-reliance proves a life of independence is possible in the contemporary social climate. Additionally, Chien Ying-Ying contends against Lu Xun's favour for external change over internal awakening, arguing that 'without internal change, even if they have money, Chinese women would still be puppets and dolls, both at home and in society at large.'

Another major flaw of Lu Xun's interpretation is his marginalization of women's issues in contemporary China. As he diverts from a feminist interpretation of Nora, Lu Xun's consideration of women's fate is subordinate to the fate of contemporary China. Like Hu Shi and many other May Fourth male writers, his criticisms on gender oppression are framed within the nationalistic presumption that women need to find their own agenda in order for China to advance. Therefore, both Lu Xun and Hu Shi's interpretation suffers from a gendered nationalistic appropriation, making their Nora results of 'sympathetic male intuition'. Last but not least, the lack of female intellectual opinions in the Nora debates calls for further consideration for gendered biases .

Nora's influence in Lu Xun's literary practice 
In 1925, Lu Xun wrote a short story, 'Regret for the Past (伤逝,'shangshi')', which follows a young couple's disillusionment of reality after they rebel against their own families.'Regret for the Past' is considered as a direct literary successor of Lu Xun's perspective on Nora. Instead of focusing on unequal marital relationship like Ibsen did, Lu Xun addresses the evil of Chinese feudal family system and emphasizes on the importance of economic independence. The story shares similar problem of Lu Xun's Nora critique in its male-centered narrative. As Stephen Chan points out, the heroine Zijun in 'Regret for the Past' is the empty 'other' that exits only to be objectified for the male self's(her husband Juanshen's)reflection, as 'no authentic discourse for the other is represented'.

See also 

 Lu Xun
 May Fourth Movement 
 Hu Shi
 New Youth
 Republic of China
 New Women

References

External links 
 What happens after Nora walks out(1923), Lu Xun's original speech,

Works by Lu Xun
1920s speeches
Henrik Ibsen